Sir Daniel Gahan (1671 – 1713) was an Anglo-Irish politician. 

Gahan was the son of Daniel Gahan, who had been granted 1,000 acres of land in Slievardagh in 1666. Gahan was the Member of Parliament for Portarlington in the Irish House of Commons between 1692 and 1693. He later represented Rathcormack from 1703 until his death in 1713. He was made a Knight Bachelor in 1705.

References

1671 births
1713 deaths
17th-century Anglo-Irish people
18th-century Anglo-Irish people
Irish MPs 1692–1693
Irish MPs 1703–1713
Knights Bachelor
Members of the Parliament of Ireland (pre-1801) for County Cork constituencies
Members of the Parliament of Ireland (pre-1801) for King's County constituencies